Sigrid Kressmann-Zschach (1929–1990) was a German architect, businesswoman and entrepreneur. Her best known works are the Ku'Damm Karrée and Steglitzer Kreisel buildings in Berlin.

Biography

Sigrid Zschach was born in Leipzig on 27 July 1929. She graduated with a degree in architecture at the Technical University of Dresden. In the 1950s she moved to Berlin. Kressmann-Zschach married three times and is known to have had several lovers. She became known as a skillful and wealthy career woman but also for her style, blonde hair and good looks.

Kressmann-Zschach's second marriage was to Willy Kressmann, mayor of the affluent Berlin-Kreuzberg district. It allowed her to enter Berlin 'society' and she was able to obtain first hand information about new construction projects. Kressmann-Zschach heard of plans to build a new subway system to Steglitz and produced designs for a 30-storey office block, with a subway station in the basement and Germany's first shopping mall. She secured a DM180 million contract for the scheme, which became known as the Steglitzer Kreisel. The project caused continual scandal as costs escalated and eventually Kressman-Zschach's development company went bankrupt.

Kressmann-Zschach ultimately employed over 300 people. In 1971, when she employed 200 people, it was reported she resisted the election of a works council, complaining that her employees spent a third of their time in discussion rather than working. She sacked three ringleaders and demoted another. However, in the same year Kressmann-Zschach took her staff on an expenses-paid trip to New York, in return for their commitment to stay with the company for a certain period.

Kressmann-Zschach died from cancer aged 61, on 28 October 1990. Her obituary credited her with having given Berlin a piece of 'Dallas' or 'Denver'.

Notable works
 Jerusalemer Kirche, Friedrichstadt, Berlin (1968)
 Steglitzer Kreisel, Steglitz, Berlin (1968–1974)
 Kurfürstendamm Square, Berlin

References

1929 births
1990 deaths
20th-century German architects
German women architects
Architects from Leipzig
20th-century German women artists